The Lace Maker (1662) is an oil on canvas painting by the Dutch painter Caspar Netscher. It is an example of a Dutch Golden Age painting and is part of the Wallace Collection.

The woman is sitting working over a lace pillow on bobbin lace.

This painting was documented by Hofstede de Groot in 1913, who wrote; "48. THE LACE MAKER. Sm. 21. Full length. A young girl, simply dressed, sits in profile to the right. She is working with both hands at a bobbin-lace cushion held on her lap. She wears a green skirt, a bright red bodice with the white under-garment showing at the neck and the elbows, and a light cap embroidered in black. Behind her on the floor in the left foreground lie her shoes; beyond them, in the corner, stands a broom. At the back is a sunlit wall, on which to the right an unframed landscape print is loosely pinned with two nails. Signed "C. Netscher," on the margin of the print, and dated 166- [1662, according to the Pompe sale-catalog] [but 1664, according to Sir Claude Phillips and Mr. D. S. MacColl Translator]; panel [canvas, according to Mr. MacColl], 13 inches by 10 1/2 inches. Exhibited at the British Institution, London, 1818. Sales. J. Pompe van Meerdervoort, Soeterwoude, May 19, 1780, No. 5 (700 florins, Delfos). M. van Leyden, Paris, September 10, 1804 (7000 francs, Paillet) see Ch. Blanc, ii. 221. London, 1807 (£199: 10s.). In the collection of the Marquess of Hertford, London, 1833 (Sm.). In the Wallace Collection, London, 1910 catalog, No. 237."

References

External links
 Woman making lace in an interior, 1662 in the RKD

1662 paintings
Paintings of lacemakers
Paintings in the Wallace Collection
Paintings by Caspar Netscher